Odiseo Bichir Nájera (born May 3, 1960) is a Mexican actor and one of the members of the Bichir family.

Filmography

Selected films

Television roles

External links 

1960 births
Living people
Male actors from Mexico City
Mexican male film actors
Mexican male television actors